Ana-Iulia Dascăl (born 12 September 2002) is a Romanian swimmer. She competed in the women's 100 metre freestyle event at the 2016 Summer Olympics.

References

External links
 

2002 births
Living people
Olympic swimmers of Romania
Swimmers at the 2016 Summer Olympics
Place of birth missing (living people)
Romanian female freestyle swimmers
Sportspeople from Cluj-Napoca